The following list sorts all the cities in the Pakistani province of Punjab with a population of more than 100,000 according to the 2017 Census. As of 15 March 2017, 58 cities fulfill this criterion and are listed here. This list refers only to the population of individual cities, municipalities and towns within their defined limits, which does not include other municipalities or suburban areas within Urban agglomerations.

List 

The following table lists the 58 cities in Punjab with a population of at least 100,000 on 15 March 2017, according to the 2017 Census of Pakistan. A city is displayed in bold if it is a state or federal capital.

See also 

 List of cities in Chandigarh and Punjab, India by population

References 

 
Punjab